Winners Merchants International L.P is a chain of off-price Canadian department stores owned by TJX Companies.

It offers brand name clothing, footwear, bedding, furniture, fine jewelry, beauty products, and housewares. Products are at a 20-60% discount rate and the stores generally do not carry the same merchandise for an entire season. The firm does not sell   online. Its market niche is similar to the American store TJ Maxx, and it is a partnered retailer to department stores HomeSense and Marshalls.

History

In 1982, Winners was founded in Toronto, Ontario by David Margolis and Neil Rosenberg. It was one of the first off-price department stores in Canada. In 1990, it merged with TJX Companies, the world's largest off-price department store owner.

Since late 2001, Winners stores have been paired with HomeSense, a home accessory retailer, modelled on TJX's American HomeGoods stores. Winners acquired the struggling "Labels" brand from Dylex in 2001. Labels had been meant to compete with Winners, but never succeeded; most of its stores have been turned into Homesense stores.

Les Ailes de la Mode opened a similar concept under the Labels banner after Winners did not renew its trademark on the name.

Controversy  
In 2016, CBC's Marketplace investigated Winner's "compared at" pricing and found that retail price of the manufacture could be misleading and inaccurate. For example, "researchers at Marketplace found that a Risk board game at Winners was being sold for $49.99, with a "compared at" price of $100.00. However, the game was available at full price from retailer F.G Bradley's Canadian website for $74.99." Winners responded by saying "compared at" prices are accurate and fair, and that the misunderstanding could be a result of an error in pricing merchandise due to their large volume of product intake. In follow up letter to CBC marketplace, Winners was able to verify every "compared at" price for 20 out of the 21 items, by finding the items at the "compared at" prices at comparable retailers.  For the remaining item, Winners admitted that it was an error on their part and pledged to fix the mismatch.

See also
List of Canadian department stores

References

External links

Winners Official Website

1982 establishments in Ontario
Companies based in Mississauga
Canadian brands
Department stores of Canada
Discount stores of Canada
Retail companies established in 1982
TJX Companies
1990 mergers and acquisitions